Aleksandrów  is a village in the administrative district of Gmina Chlewiska, within Szydłowiec County, Masovian Voivodeship, in east-central Poland.

In 2008, the village had a population of 170.

References

Villages in Szydłowiec County